N,N’-Dibutylhexamethylenediamine (dibutylhexanediamine) is a chemical compound used in the production of polymers.  It is highly toxic upon inhalation, and is listed as an extremely hazardous substance as defined by the U.S. Emergency Planning and Community Right-to-Know Act.

See also
 Hexamethylenediamine

References

Diamines